When Heaven Comes to Town is the fourth album by composer C.W. Vrtacek, released in 1988 through RēR Megacorp. Despite never being individually issued on CD, the album can be found in its entirety on the anthology Silent Heaven.

Track listing

Personnel 
Myles Davis – mixing
Michael Gellatly – illustrations, design
Maria Meleschnig – photography
C.W. Vrtacek – Ensoniq Mirage, ukulele, tape, piano, production, engineering, mixing
Tim Young – mastering

References 

1988 albums
C.W. Vrtacek albums